Pedro de Ursúa (1526 –January 1, 1561) was a Spanish conquistador from Baztan in Navarre. He is best known for his final trip with Lope de Aguirre in search for El Dorado, where he found death in a plot.

He was born in Arizkun, Baztan, to a Beaumont family who supported the Spanish occupation of Navarre, benefiting directly from the Navarrese loyalist defeat at Amaiur in July 1522.

In Panama, Ursúa subdued a Cimarron (ex-slave) revolt by tricking Cimarron leader Bayano into coming unprepared to negotiate a truce. He then captured Bayano and sent him back to King Philip II of Spain. Together with Ortún Velázquez de Velasco, Pedro de Ursúa founded the city of Pamplona, New Kingdom of Granada, on November 1, 1549.

Ursúa later searched the Amazon region for El Dorado with Lope de Aguirre. When Ursúa would not allow Aguirre's mistress on the expedition, Aguirre conspired with another officer, Fernando de Guzman, to use this rejection as a pretext to start a riot in which they assassinated Ursúa and seized power.

Pedro de Ursúa in fiction 
A fictional version of Ursúa and Aguirre's story is depicted in the Werner Herzog film, Aguirre, der Zorn Gottes and in the Carlos Saura film El Dorado.

The novel Ursúa by William Ospina has become one of the main references concerning Pedro de Ursúa. The book provides details about the life of Ursúa and makes a general account of the events happening in the New World during the mid 16th century.

Gallery

See also 

List of conquistadors in Colombia
El Dorado
Muzo

References

Further reading

External links
 Translation of Illustrated Encyclopedia of the Basque Country article on Lope de Aguirre - contains large segment on Ursúa's Dorado expedition
  Pedro de Ursua at Artehistora.com
  El Asesinato de Pedro de Ursua
 

1526 births
1561 deaths
Spanish conquistadors
Explorers of Amazonia
People from Baztán (comarca)
History of Colombia
16th-century people from the Kingdom of Navarre